Theta Herculis is a single, variable star in the northern constellation of Hercules. This object is visible to the naked eye as a faint, orange-hued star with an apparent visual magnitude of 3.851. Based upon parallax measurements, it is located around 750 light years away from the Sun. The star is advancing toward the Earth with a heliocentric radial velocity of –28 km/s.

This is an aging K-type bright giant with a stellar classification of K1IIaCN2, where the suffix notation indicates a strong overabundance of CN in the spectrum. The brightness variations of this star was first noticed in 1935 by M. Fedtke and confirmed by Erich Przybyllok and Kurt Walter the same year. French astronomer Paul Muller then classified Theta Herculis as an irregular variable with a range of magnitudes between 3.7 and 4.1 and a periodicity of roughly 8–9 days.

The star is about 130 million years old with 4.94 times the mass of the Sun. With the hydrogen at its core exhausted, the star has expanded to 90 times the Sun's radius. It is radiating 2,406 times the luminosity of the Sun from its enlarged photosphere at an effective temperature of 4,266 K.

Nomenclature and etymology 
θ Herculis is the Bayer designation, Latinised to Theta Herculis, abbreviated to θ Her or Theta Her.

In the Calendarium of Al Achsasi Al Mouakket, this star was designated Rekbet al Jathih al Aisr, which was translated into Latin as Genu Sinistrum Ingeniculi, meaning the left knee of the kneeling man.  The traditional name Rukbalgethi Genubi that is encountered in various texts is etymologically similar to the stars Ruchbah and Zubenelgenubi, the term "ruchbah" meaning "knee" while "genubi" signifies "southern"—hence the "southern knee", a meaning which can be gleaned more easily by looking at the accompanying constellation map.

It was also Tien Ke, Heaven's Record.

References

External links 
Spacedude's Constellation map: Stars in Hercules

K-type bright giants
Suspected variables
Hercules (constellation)
Herculis, theta
BD+37 2982
Herculis, 091
163770
087808
6695
Rukbalgethi Genubi